Mojahedin of the Islamic Revolution Organization was an umbrella political organization in Iran, founded in 1979 by unification of seven underground Islamist revolutionary paramilitary and civil organizations which previously fought against the Pahlavi monarchy.

The organization was firmly allied with the ruling Islamic Republican Party and was given a share of power and three of its members were appointed as government ministers under PM Mir-Hossein Mousavi: Behzad Nabavi (minister without portfolio for executive affairs), Mohammad Salamati (agriculture) and Mohammad Shahab Gonabadi (housing and urban development).

History 
 The groups were:
"United Ummah" (Ommat-e-Vahede)
"Monotheistic Badr" (Towhidiye-Badr)
"Monotheistic Queue" (Towhidiye-Saff)
"Peasant" (Fallah)
"Daybreak" (: Falaq)
"Victors" (Mansouroun)
"Monotheists" (Movahedin)

Dissolution 
The organization dissolved in 1986 as a result of tensions between the leftist and rightist members.

Legacy 
Left-wing members of the organization decided to resume activities in 1991 and established leftist Mojahedin of the Islamic Revolution of Iran Organization (adding the words “of Iran” to the name) which later emerged as a reformist party. Some right-wing members founded Society of Devotees of the Islamic Revolution in late-1990s.

Notable members

References

Defunct political parties of the Islamic Republic of Iran
1979 establishments in Iran
Political parties established in 1979
1986 disestablishments in Iran
Political parties disestablished in 1986
Islamic political parties in Iran
Political parties of the Iranian Revolution
Guerrilla organizations
Militant opposition to the Pahlavi dynasty
Anti-communist organizations
Paramilitary organisations based in Iran
Khomeinist groups